Otto Ubbelohde (5 January 1867 – 8 May 1922) was a German painter, etcher and illustrator.

Life 
Ubbelohde was born and grew up in Marburg, where his father  was a professor at the University of Marburg. From 1900 he lived in Goßfelden, nowadays a part of the community of Lahntal.

Work 
Ubbelohde gained international fame for illustrating books of Grimm's Fairy Tales, 1906 and 1908 creating about 450 illustrations of fairy tales. He often took inspiration for his drawings from the landscape and buildings near his atelier and domicile in Goßfelden. For Rapunzel's tower he used as a model a building in Amönau called Lustschlößchen, while in Mother Hulda the landscape is inspired by the Rimberg.

Gallery

Book illustrations 
 Pussi Mau, und andere Tiergeschichten, Schaffstein, Cologne, circa 1904
 Gebrüder Grimm / Rob Riemann (Editor): Kinder und Hausmärchen gesammelt durch die Brüder Grimm. With 446 illustrations of Otto Ubbelohde. 3 Volumes. Turm-Verlag, Leipzig 1906
 Otto Ubbelohde: Aus Alt-Marburg. 20 Landschaftsbilder von Otto Ubbelohde.  N. G. Elwert'sche Verlagsbuchhandlung, Marburg 1906
 Otto Ubbelohde: Rings um Marburg. 20 Landschaftsbilder von Otto Ubbelohde. N. G. Elwert'sche Verlagsbuchhandlung, Marburg 1907
 Karl Ernst Knodt / Otto Ubbelohde (Illustrations): Meine Wälder. Worte von Karl Ernst Knodt. Bilder von Otto Ubbelohde. Verlag Hermann A. Wiechmann, München 1910
 Ernst Piltz / Otto Ubbelohde (Illustrations): Führer durch Jena. Fromann'sche Hofbuchhandlung Eckard Klostermann, Jena 1912
 Gebrüder Grimm / Rob Riemann (Editors): Die Grimmschen Märchen in einer Auswahl. Turm-Verlag, Leipzig 1912
 Otto Ubbelohde: Aus schöner alter Zeit. Federzeichnungen von Otto Ubbelohde. N. G. Elwert'sche Verlagsbuchhandlung, Marburg 1913
 Martin Lang / Otto Ubbelohde (Illustrations): Alt-Tübingen. 30 Federzeichnungen von Otto Ubbelohde.  Wilhelm Kloeres, Tübingen 1913
 Otto Ubbelohde: Städte und Burgen an der Lahn. 20 Zeichnungen von Otto Ubbelohde. N. G. Elwert'sche Verlagsbuchhandlung, Marburg 1914
 F. Bruns / H. Mahn / Otto Ubbelohde (Illustrations) / Verein zur Hebung des Fremdenverkehrs in Lübeck (Editor): Lübeck. Ein Führer durch die Freie u. Hansestadt und ihre nähere Umgebung. Rathgens, Lübeck 1918
 B. Flemes / Otto Ubbelohde (Illustrations): Führer durch Hameln. Schatzenberg, Hameln o. J. (est. 1920)
 Ernst Koch / Otto Ubbelohde (Illustrations): Prinz Rosa-Stramin. N. G. Elwert'sche Verlagsbuchhandlung, Marburg 1922
 Ludwig Harig: Da fielen auf einmal die Sterne vom Himmel. Begegnungen mit Dornröschen und dem Eisenhans – eine Märchenreise im Jugendstil. With drawings of Otto Ubbelohde. zu Klampen Verlag, Lüneburg 2002,

Notes

References 
 Bernd Küster: Otto Ubbelohde. 2nd modified edition, Lilienthal bei Bremen 1997,  (actual scientific monograph)
 Bernd Küster: Otto Ubbelohde. Worpsweder Verlag, Worpswede 1984, 
 Bernd Küster: Otto Ubbelohde und Worpswede. Worpsweder Verlag, Worpswede 1984, 
 Carl Graepler: Otto Ubbelohde - Katalog der Gemälde im Marburger Universitätsmuseum. 2. Auflage, Marburg 1988, 
 Peter Joch (Editor): Otto Ubbelohde. Kunst und Lebensreform um 1900. Exhibition catalogue Kunsthalle Darmstadt, Häußer, Darmstadt 2001, 
 Hans Laut: Otto Ubbelohde — Leben und Werk. Rembrandt-Verlag, Berlin 1943 (first monograph - tendentious to spirit of the time)

CD-ROM: 
 Kreisausschuss Marburg-Biedenkopf, Kulturamt (Editor): Otto Ubbelohdes Illustrationen zu den Kinder- und Hausmärchen der Gebrüder Grimm, Elwert-Verlag, Marburg 2001,

External links 

19th-century German painters
19th-century German male artists
German male painters
20th-century German painters
20th-century German male artists
German illustrators
People from Marburg
1867 births
1922 deaths